Littlemore Railway Cutting is a  geological Site of Special Scientific Interest on the southern outskirts of Oxford in Oxfordshire. It is a Geological Conservation Review site.

The cutting exposes limestone and clay laid down in  mid-Oxfordian stage of the Late Jurassic, around 160 million years ago. The deposit is part of the Stanford Formation, and the  clay appears to have been deposited in a channel between coral reefs which then covered the Oxford area.

References

Sites of Special Scientific Interest in Oxfordshire
Geological Conservation Review sites